The 2018 Colorado State Rams football team represented Colorado State University during the 2018 NCAA Division I FBS football season. The Rams were led by fourth-year head coach Mike Bobo and played their home games at Sonny Lubick Field at Canvas Stadium in Fort Collins, Colorado as members of the Mountain Division of the Mountain West Conference. They finished the season 3–9, 2–6 in Mountain West play to finish in fifth place in the Mountain Division.

Previous season
The Rams finished the 2017 season 7–6, 5–3 in Mountain West play to finish in a tie for second place in the Mountain Division. They were invited to the New Mexico Bowl where they lost to Marshall.

Preseason

Award watch lists
Listed in the order that they were released

Mountain West media days
During the Mountain West media days held July 24–25 at the Cosmopolitan on the Las Vegas Strip, the Rams were predicted to finish in third place in the Mountain Division.

Media poll

Preseason All-Mountain West Team
The Rams had one player selected to the preseason all-Mountain West team.

Specialists

Ryan Stonehouse – P

Schedule

Source:

Game summaries

Hawaii

vs Colorado

Arkansas

at Florida

Illinois State

at San Jose State

New Mexico

at Boise State

Wyoming

at Nevada

Utah State

at Air Force

Players in the 2019 NFL Draft

References

Colorado State
Colorado State Rams football seasons
Colorado State Rams football